Domingo González (born 30 January 1970) is a Mexican cyclist. He competed in the men's individual road race at the 1996 Summer Olympics.

References

External links
 

1970 births
Living people
Mexican male cyclists
Olympic cyclists of Mexico
Cyclists at the 1996 Summer Olympics
Place of birth missing (living people)
Competitors at the 2002 Central American and Caribbean Games
Competitors at the 2006 Central American and Caribbean Games